Probythinella is a genus of very small aquatic snails, operculate gastropod mollusks in the family Hydrobiidae.

Species
Species within the genus Probythinella include:

 Probythinella protera Pilsbry, 1953

References

Hydrobiidae
Monotypic gastropod genera